The molecular formula C2H6O2 (molar mass: 62.07 g/mol, exact mass: 62.03678 u) may refer to:

 Ethylene glycol (ethane-1,2-diol)
 Ethyl hydroperoxide
 Methoxymethanol
 Dimethyl peroxide